Archabil District was formerly a district of Ashgabat, Turkmenistan. It was merged with Chandybil District on 4 February 2015 but retained its name. Archabil District was subsequently absorbed by Abadan District in January 2018 and the combined district was renamed Büzmeýin District (viz.). 

Districts of Turkmenistan